Sir Francis Wyatt Truscott (24 November 1824 – 3 March 1895) was Lord Mayor of London in 1879–80, a member of the Worshipful Company of Stationers and the father of George Wyatt Truscott, the Lord Mayor of London in 1908–09.

Family
Truscott was born in Truro, Cornwall in 1824 to James Truscott and educated at King's College London. In 1847 he married Eliza Freeman. They had two sons and one daughter,
 George Wyatt (1857–1941), 1st Baronet
 a son
 Louisa Edith, married Homewood Crawford, later Sir Homewood, City Solicitor.

His residences included an estate at East Grinstead, West Sussex; Essex Lodge, Upper Norwood; and Victoria Street, London.

Career
Truscott was a wholesale stationer and head of the firm, Messrs James Truscott and Sons, of Suffolk Lane, London. He was elected a member of the Court of Common Council for the Dowgate Ward in 1858 and was Sheriff of London and Middlesex in 1871. Truscott was an unsuccessful Conservative candidate for the Dudley ward in 1865. A keen freemason, he was Grand Bard of England. Wyatt was appointed Worshipful Master of No. 1 Grand Masters Lodge at the resumption of his mayoralty. In November 1880, Griffins, also known as Truscott's Folly, were unveiled at Temple Bar by the Duke of Albany. He was also the first President of the London Society of Artists.

He was appointed a Knight Bachelor. In 1883 he was elected Master of the Worshipful Company of Haberdashers.

Truscott died on 3 March 1895 aged 70 and is buried in Norwood cemetery

References

1824 births
1895 deaths
People from Truro
Alumni of King's College London
British merchants
Freemasons of the United Grand Lodge of England
Conservative Party (UK) parliamentary candidates
Sheriffs of the City of London
19th-century lord mayors of London
19th-century English politicians
Burials at West Norwood Cemetery
Knights Bachelor
People from Victoria, London
People from East Grinstead
19th-century British businesspeople